Pontiano Kaleebu is a Ugandan physician, clinical immunologist, HIV/AIDS researcher, academic and medical administrator, who is the executive director of the Uganda Virus Research Institute.

He also concurrently serves as the director of the joint clinical research unit owned by the Medical Research Council (United Kingdom), the Uganda Virus Research Institute, and the London School of Hygiene & Tropical Medicine, located in Entebbe, Uganda, carrying on research in infectious, non-communicable and neglected diseases.

Background and education
Pontiano Kaleebu was born in Uganda, circa 1960. He attended Jinja Kaloli Primary School, in Wakiso District, where he obtained his Primary Leaving Certificate. He then transferred to St. Mary's College Kisubi, where he undertook his O-Level studies. He completed his A-Level education at Kampala High School, where he obtained his High School Diploma.

He was admitted to Makerere University School of Medicine, where he graduated with a Bachelor of Medicine and Bachelor of Surgery degree in the mid 1980s. He interned at St. Francis Hospital Nsambya, under Dr. Merriam Duggan.

In 1988, Kaleebu was awarded a scholarship to study immunology at the Royal Postgraduate Medical School, at Hammersmith Hospital, in West London, in the United Kingdom. He graduated with a Diploma in Immunology.

While in London, he was offered the opportunity to pursue a doctorate in immunology, by the University of London, on scholarship, under Professor Jonathan Weber, at St Mary's Hospital, London. He completed his PhD program in the mid 1990s.

Career
1987, Kaleebu was recruited as a medical research officer at the Uganda Virus Research Institute, by its director, Dr. Sylvester Sempala. Following the completion of his PhD studies, Kaleebu returned to the institute and was appointed as the head of the immunology department. The following year, he joined the joint research programme at the Medical Research Council and the Uganda Virus Research Institute.

Over the years, Dr Kaleebu has become a leading international researcher in the areas of immunology and virology and is a member to the international team that participated the first vaccine trial in Africa against HIV/AIDS. In the late 2000s, he became the director of the Uganda Virus Research Institute in an acting capacity. He was confirmed in that position in the mid-2010s. He is a Professor of immunovirology at the London School of Hygiene and Tropical Medicine.

Other considerations
His main research interests are HIV vaccine research especially understanding HIV diversity and resistance to antiretroviral drugs, as well as the protective immune responses. He is the recipient of numerous Awards including (a) the Scientific Achievement Award from Rotary International, awarded in 2003 (b) the Presidential Science Award 2005/2006 and (c) the Fellowship of Imperial College London, Faculty of Medicine, awarded in 2010 (d) Fellow of the Royal College of Physicians of Edinburgh- FRCP Edin 2016 (e) 		Fellow of the Academy of Medical Sciences-FMedSci 2020. (f) Fellow of the Uganda National Academy of Science-FUNAS 2021. He has co-authored more than 260 publications in peer reviewed journals. Some of his most cited publications include; Global and regional molecular epidemiology of HIV-1, 1990–2015: a systematic review, global survey, and trend analysis (2019), HIV subtype diversity worldwide (2019), Safety and Immunogenicity of a 2-Dose Heterologous Vaccination Regimen With Ad26.ZEBOV and MVA-BN-Filo Ebola Vaccines: 12-Month Data From a Phase 1 Randomized Clinical Trial in Uganda and Tanzania (2019), HIV-1 drug resistance before initiation or re-initiation of first-line antiretroviral therapy in low-income and middle-income countries: a systematic review and meta-regression analysis (2018), Rare variant in scavenger receptor BI raises HDL cholesterol and increases risk of coronary heart disease (2016), Global epidemiology of drug resistance after failure of WHO recommended first-line regimens for adult HIV-1 infection: a multicentre retrospective cohort study (2016), The African genome variation project shapes medical genetics in Africa (2015), Geographic and Temporal Trends in the Molecular Epidemiology and Genetic Mechanisms of Transmitted HIV-1 Drug Resistance: An Individual-Patient- and Sequence-Level Meta-Analysis (2015), A KIR B centromeric region present in Africans but not Europeans protects pregnant women from pre-eclampsia (2015), Towards host-directed therapies for tuberculosis (2015), Randomised controlled trials for Ebola: practical and ethical issues (2014), Immune activation alters cellular and humoral responses to yellow fever 17D vaccine (2014), Pregnancy, parturition and preeclampsia in women of African ancestry (2014), Discovery and refinement of loci associated with lipid levels (2013), Common variants associated with plasma triglycerides and risk for coronary artery disease (2013), Association of HIV and ART with cardiometabolic traits in sub-Saharan Africa: a systematic review and meta-analysis (2013), High HIV incidence and socio-behavioral risk patterns in fishing communities on the shores of Lake Victoria, Uganda (2012), HIV and syphilis prevalence and associated risk factors among fishing communities of Lake Victoria, Uganda (2011), Transmitted HIV type 1 drug resistance among individuals with recent HIV infection in East and Southern Africa (2011), CLSI-derived hematology and biochemistry reference intervals for healthy adults in eastern and southern Africa (2009), Safety and immunogenicity of recombinant low-dosage HIV-1 A vaccine candidates vectored by plasmid pTHr DNA or modified vaccinia virus Ankara (MVA) in humans in East Africa (2008), Relation between chemokine receptor use, disease stage, and HIV-1 subtypes A and D: results from a rural Ugandan cohort (2007), The glutamine-rich region of the HIV-1 Tat protein is involved in T-cell apoptosis (2004), Effect of human immunodeficiency virus (HIV) type 1 envelope subtypes A and D on disease progression in a large cohort of HIV-1—positive persons in Uganda (2002), Relationship between HIV-1 Env subtypes A and D and disease progression in a rural Ugandan cohort (2001), Neutralization serotypes of human immunodeficiency virus type 1 field isolates are not predicted by genetic subtype. The WHO network for HIV isolation and characterization (1996)

Awards 
He received a medal of service from the government of the Republic of Uganda

References

External links
Profile of Uganda Virus Research Institute
Global Virus Network Adds Uganda Virus Research Institute As Newest Center of Excellence As of 29 May 2018.

	

Living people
1960 births
Ugandan immunologists
HIV/AIDS researchers
Makerere University alumni
Alumni of the University of London